Joshua McCloughan (born 12 December 1975, in Sydney, New South Wales, Australia) is a former A-League footballer who played as a central defender. An FFA A-Licence coach, he has spent time within Ange Postecoglou's Caltex Socceroos coaching setup and as a Joey's (Australian U17's) assistant. A foundation Brisbane Roar player, Josh returned to the club to coach the Brisbane Roar FC Youth team in the 2015/16 season. Josh has completed a Bachelor of Management, and regularly commentates A-League football for ABC Grandstand.

Early career
Josh played in youth and men's divisions for Palm Beach for 9 years. He also played for the Brisbane Strikers before being signed as a foundation player by the Brisbane Roar.

Playing career
In 2005, he signed with A league club Brisbane Roar where he was a first team regular. He played 16 games in his first season with the club. In 2010, he retired from professional football. He played 90 games for the Brisbane Roar, scoring 5 goals despite playing as a defender.

Coaching career

Josh commenced his coaching career under significant mentorship from an array of highly experienced coaches, supported by Football Queensland and the FFA. Josh assisted the Queensland NTC program in 2013 and managed the 2014 campaign. After coaching the Queensland Academy of Sport (QAS) side in 2013 and 2014, in 2015 Josh returned to the Brisbane Roar as their under 18's Academy/QAS head coach. He then assumed the head coach role of the Brisbane Roar Youth Team for the 2015/16 season. The widely regarded young coach terminated his contract at the troubled Roar for professional reasons in August 2016.

He played a key role in Ange Postecoglou's scouting setup in the Caltex Socceroos AFC Asian Cup Championship in 2015 and World Cup Qualifiers, and acted as assistant coach for the U17 Australian team (Joeys) and the Socceroos on tours in 2015.

A-League statistics

1 - includes A-League final series statistics
2 - includes FIFA Club World Cup statistics; AFC Champions League statistics are included in season commencing after group stages (i.e. ACL and A-League seasons etc.)

References

External links 
 Brisbane Roar profile
 Oz Football profile
 http://www.couriermail.com.au/sport/football/brisbane-roar-assistant-joins-ange-postecoglou-for-socceroos-world-cup-campaign/news-story/bf735c0391d20f8f860ee96a1c2d7ffa
 http://www.theaustralian.com.au/sport/opinion/tim-cahill-a-great-signing-but-ffa-still-has-fires-to-fight/news-story/2310cf8966a19bdecb25ff7c460cc0a6
 http://websites.sportstg.com/assoc_page.cgi?client=1-9385-0-0-0&sID=269940&&news_task=DETAIL&articleID=46544028

1975 births
Living people
Soccer players from Sydney
A-League Men players
National Soccer League (Australia) players
Brisbane Strikers FC players
Brisbane Roar FC players
Association football defenders
Australian soccer players